The 1971 San Diego State Aztecs football team represented San Diego State College during the 1971 NCAA University Division football season as a member of the Pacific Coast Athletic Association (PCAA).

The Aztecs were led by head coach Don Coryell, in his eleventh year, and played home games at San Diego Stadium in San Diego, California. They finished the season with a record of six wins and five losses (6–5, 2–3 PCAA).

Schedule

Team players in the NFL
The following were selected in the 1972 NFL Draft.

Team awards

Notes

References

San Diego State
San Diego State Aztecs football seasons
San Diego State Aztecs football